North Brixton is a locality in the London Borough of Lambeth in South London, formerly in Surrey.

Notable people associated with North Brixton
Ernest Stafford Carlos (1883-1917), painter and war artist
Charles Roger Dod (1793-1855), writer of parliamentary and genealogical works
Thomas Gaspey (1788-1871), writer

Brixton